Dalkeith is a film about the story of the residents in the Dalkeith Retirement Home who obtain a greyhound. The movies was marketed to an older audience. They named the dog Dalkeith after the home but due to the intervention of one of the resident's relatives problems arise.

The film was shot in 15 days in Ballarat and was made with private investment.

References

External links

Australian comedy-drama films
2000s English-language films
2002 comedy-drama films
2000s Australian films